Lakadbaggha  is a 2023 Indian Hindi-language action thriller film produced by First Ray Films & directed by Victor Mukherjee and starring Anshuman Jha, Ridhi Dogra, Paresh Pahuja and Milind Soman. The film had its World Premiere on 21 December 2022, at the prestigious Kolkata International Film Festival & its International Premiere on 28 December 2022 at the HBO South Asian International Film Festival, New York. The film also won the Best Actor Award for Anshuman Jha at the HBO South Asian International Film Festival for his humane portrayal of the animal lover vigilante.

Cast  
Anshuman Jha as Arjun Bakshi.
Riddhi Dogra as Akshara D'Souza.
Paresh Pahuja as Aryan. 
Milind Soman as Arjun's father.
Eksha Kerung as The Girl With No Name.
Bijou Thaangjam as Shopkeeper 
Kharaj Mukherjee as Arjun's uncle.

Reception 
A critic from CNN-News18 wrote that "Lakadbaggha will entertain you with its scrupulousness, an out-of-the-ordinary plot and top-notch performances.".
A critic from The Hindu wrote that "Though not bad, a few more drafts would have turned this wild idea with myriad possibilities into a compelling watch for teenagers and their parents". A critic from The Telegraph wrote that "Anshuman Jha-starrer Lakadbaggha is a comic book-style action movie with a dash of romance". A critic from The Times of India wrote that "In Lakadbaggha Anshuman Jha of ‘LSD (Love Sex Aur Dhokha)’ fame has flawlessly portrayed a vigilante. He looks like the boy next door, but he executes several hand-to-hand combat action sequences with finesse.". A critic from Rediff wrote that "Lakadbaggha takes up too many issues and does not do justice to them".

References